Endozoicomonas acroporae is a Gram-negative, rod-shaped, aerobic and non-motile bacterium from the genus of Endozoicomonas which has been isolated from the coral Acropora.

References

External links
Type strain of Endozoicomonas acroporae at BacDive -  the Bacterial Diversity Metadatabase

Oceanospirillales
Bacteria described in 2017